Arthur Maxime Chuquet (28 February 1853 – 7 June 1925) was a French historian and biographer.

He was born in Rocroi, Ardennes. He is now best known for his Jeunesse de Napoléon appearing in three volumes from 1897 to 1899. He became a member of the Institut de France in 1900.

Works
The Wars of the Revolution: The Siege of Mainz and the French Occupation of the Rhineland 1792-93: On Military Matters 2006

1853 births
1925 deaths
People from Ardennes (department)
19th-century French historians
20th-century French historians
Historians of Germany
French biographers
École Normale Supérieure alumni
Academic staff of the École Normale Supérieure
Academic staff of the Collège de France
Members of the Académie des sciences morales et politiques
French male non-fiction writers
Members of the Ligue de la patrie française